The Military Bowl is a post-season National Collegiate Athletic Association-sanctioned Division I college football bowl game that has been played annually each December in the Washington metropolitan area since 2008. The game was originally held at Robert F. Kennedy Memorial Stadium in Washington, D.C. before moving to Navy–Marine Corps Memorial Stadium in Annapolis, Maryland in 2013. The 2014 through 2019 games featured teams from the American Athletic Conference and the Atlantic Coast Conference.

During initial planning stages, the game was known as the Congressional Bowl, but was first played in 2008 as the EagleBank Bowl sponsored by Washington-area financial institution EagleBank. The game became the Military Bowl when Northrop Grumman was the title sponsor from 2010 to 2019. In 2020, the game was sponsored by Perspecta Inc. and officially known as the Military Bowl presented by Perspecta. Beginning in 2021, the game is sponsored by Peraton and known as the Military Bowl presented by Peraton.

On December 20, 2020, several bowls were cancelled due to a lack of available teams. The Military Bowl – which again was to have featured teams from the American Athletic Conference and the Atlantic Coast Conference – was also unable to secure teams, and on December 21, 2020, organizers announced that the 2020 bowl would not be played.

On December 26, 2021, the 2021 edition of the bowl was canceled due to COVID issues within the Boston College team; it had been set to face East Carolina on December 27.

Origins
The idea for the EagleBank Bowl originated with the Washington, D.C. Bowl Committee, a group founded by Marie Rudolph and Sean Metcalf in December 2006 with the intended purpose of bringing a bowl game to the Washington, D.C. area as a boon to the region's economy.  The D.C. Sports and Entertainment Commission and the Washington, D.C. Convention and Tourism Corporation announced their support of the proposed event in 2007.

History 
The bowl game was one of two approved by the National Collegiate Athletic Association (NCAA) for the 2008 college football bowl season, the other being the St. Petersburg Bowl. The NCAA's Postseason Football Licensing Subcommittee approved the bowl on April 30, 2008, allowing the committee that had proposed the game to host it after the 2008 college football season. The inaugural game had its kickoff scheduled for 11 AM EST on December 20, 2008, making it the first bowl game of the 2008–09 bowl season.

In 2010, organizers announced that the NCAA had granted a four-year extension of the game's bowl certification, taking it through the 2013–14 bowl season; additionally, the game received sponsorship from Northrop Grumman and was renamed. In 2010, the game generated in excess of $18 million for the Washington, D.C. area. Also, over $100,000 was donated to the USO.

Conference tie-ins
Prior to the game's approval by the NCAA, Navy and the Atlantic Coast Conference (ACC) signed agreements to participate in the game if it was approved. Under the agreement, the ACC would provide its ninth-best team for the bowl if the league had nine bowl eligible teams.  In December 2008, the initial game featured Navy against Wake Forest representing the ACC.

Along with its ACC tie-in, the bowl signed an agreement with Army to play in the 2009 edition of the game, however Army did not finish its season bowl eligible. Additionally, the ACC did not have enough eligible teams and Conference USA (C-USA) could not provide a team, so organizers chose Mid-American Conference (MAC) team Temple to fill one spot and Pac-10 Conference team UCLA to fill the other spot.

For the 2010 through 2013 games, the bowl reached agreement for an ACC team to face a C-USA team (2010), Navy (2011), Army (2012), and a Big 12 team (2013). If Navy or Army were not bowl eligible, a Big 12 team would be selected in 2011, and a C-USA team in 2012.  In 2012, Army was not bowl eligible and the ACC could not supply a team, so a MAC vs. Western Athletic Conference (WAC) matchup was organized.

Starting with the 2014 game, organizers entered a six-year agreement for the game to feature an ACC vs. American Athletic Conference (The American) matchup. In July 2019, the bowl announced that the ACC vs. AAC arrangement would continue through the 2025–26 football season.
 

Bold conference denotes winner of games played.

Game results
Rankings are based on the AP Poll prior to the game.

Source:
First five editions played at Robert F. Kennedy Memorial Stadium in Washington, D.C.
Subsequent games played at Navy–Marine Corps Memorial Stadium in Annapolis, Maryland

MVPs

Source:

Most appearances

Updated through the December 2022 edition (13 games, 26 total appearances).

Teams with multiple appearances

Teams with a single appearance
Won (6): Duke, Marshall, North Carolina, San Jose State, Toledo, UCLA

Lost (6): Air Force, Bowling Green, East Carolina, Pittsburgh, UCF, Virginia

Appearances by conference
Updated through the December 2022 edition (13 games, 26 total appearances).

 The WAC no longer sponsors FBS football.
 Independent appearances: Navy (2008)

Game records

Source:

Media coverage

The bowl has been televised by ESPN since its inception.

See also
 Sports in Washington, D.C.

Notes

References

External links

 

 
College football bowls
Recurring sporting events established in 2008